Ilolo Mpya is an administrative ward in the Iringa Rural district of the Iringa Region of Tanzania. In 2016 the Tanzania National Bureau of Statistics report there were 6,672 people in the ward, from 6,376 in 2012.

Villages / vitongoji 
The ward has 4 villages and 17 vitongoji.

 Ilolompya
 Ilolo
 Magangamatitu
 Mllimani
 Luganga
 Barabarambili
 Kihesa
 Mawande
 Motomoto
 Mtakuja
 Sadani
 Ukwega
 Uwanjani
 Magozi
 Isegelele
 Kimalanongwa
 Magozi
 Mkombilenga
 Chamamba
 Mtakuja
 Muungano

References 

Wards of Iringa Region